Jalpatagua is a town and municipality in the Jutiapa department of Guatemala.

References

External links
ALL ABOUT JALPATAGUA

Municipalities of the Jutiapa Department